Thomasboro is a village in Champaign County, Illinois, United States. The population was 1,034 at the 2020 census.

The village has the name of John Thomas, a pioneer settler.

Geography
Thomasboro is located at  (40.242025, -88.187745).

Demographics

As of the 2020 census there were 1,034 people, 452 households, and 300 families residing in the village. The racial makeup of the village was 91.59% White, 1.74% African American, 0.10% Native American, 0.10% Asian, 1.55% from other races, and 4.93% from two or more races. Hispanic or Latino of any race were 4.74% of the population.

There were 452 households, out of which 28.98% had children under the age of 18 living with them, 51.99% were married couples living together, 10.84% had a female householder with no husband present, and 33.63% were non-families. 28.98% of all households were made up of individuals, and 7.08% had someone living alone who was 65 years of age or older. The average household size was 2.73 and the average family size was 2.29.The village's age distribution consisted of 16.1% under the age of 18, 10.2% from 18 to 24, 21.8% from 25 to 44, 35.2% from 45 to 64, and 16.8% who were 65 years of age or older. The median age was 47.1 years. For every 100 females, there were 100.8 males. For every 100 females age 18 and over, there were 105.4 males.

The median income for a household in the village was $55,795, and the median income for a family was $82,917. Males had a median income of $40,019 versus $36,369 for females. The per capita income for the village was $35,869. About 9.7% of families and 11.3% of the population were below the poverty line, including 32.3% of those under age 18 and none of those age 65 or over.

Notable people
 Mark Arie, winner of two 1920 Summer Olympics gold medals in shooting, was born in Thomasboro.
 Terry Shaw A.K.A. "T.Shaw", winner of 2009 VH1 Tool Academy (season 2).

Controversy
Village President Tyler Evans attended the Capitol Riot and violent insurrection in Washington, D.C. on January 6, 2021. Evans wrongly accused the media of lying about the violence online afterward.  Evans admitted to public urination on Capital grounds. He later issued a statement apologizing for his comments and condemning the violence at the Capitol.

The Thomasboro Grade School "Indian" mascot propagates a harmful stereotype. On January 18, 2022, the Thomasboro school board voted 4–3 to retain the nickname. School board president, William Wilken and board members Derek Wolken, Thomas Henkelman, and Matt Bartell were each in favor of keeping the "Indian" mascot name. Several Native American groups submitted letters encouraging the board to retire the derogatory nickname.

References

External links

Village of Thomasboro

Villages in Champaign County, Illinois
Villages in Illinois